Mór Ungerleider (January 18, 1872 in Mezőlaborc – April 20, 1955 in Budapest) was a Hungarian cafe owner and showman, and was the first person to show cinema in Hungary.

The first film was shot in Hungary in 1896 by Arnold Sziklay. Ungerleider owned the Velence Café in Rákóczi út, a street in Budapest, where he showed films. To begin with, he just projected films in his cafe, but he later adapted his projector to shoot film and in 1898 formed Projectograph with József Neumann.

Mór Ungerleider was active from 1902 to 1923 with 53 Producer Credits.

He was married to Janka Glänczer in March 17, 1920.

References

External links 
 
 
 http://mek.niif.hu/00300/00355/html/ABC16127/16191.htm

1872 births
1955 deaths
19th-century Hungarian people
20th-century Hungarian people
Businesspeople in coffee
Hungarian restaurateurs
Hungarian film people
Businesspeople from Budapest